The 2023 NBL Finals will be the postseason tournament of the National Basketball League's 2022–23 season.

Format 
The finals will be played in February and March 2023 between the top six teams of the regular season, consisting of three play-in games, two best-of-three semifinal series and the best-of-five Grand Final series, where the higher seed hosts the first, third and fifth games.

The top two seeds in the regular season will automatically qualify to the semifinals. Teams ranked three to six will compete in the play-in tournament. The third seed will play the fourth seed for third spot and the loser will play the winner of fifth or sixth for the fourth seed. This will be the first season the league will introduce play-in games.

Qualification

Qualified teams

Ladder

Ladder progression

Seedings 

 Sydney Kings
 New Zealand Breakers
 Cairns Taipans
 Tasmania JackJumpers
 S.E. Melbourne Phoenix
 Perth Wildcats

The NBL tie-breaker system as outlined in the NBL Rules and Regulations states that in the case of an identical win–loss record, the overall points percentage will determine order of seeding.

Playoff Bracket

Play-in tournament

Play-in qualifier

(5) S.E. Melbourne Phoenix vs. (6) Perth Wildcats

Seeding qualifier

(3) Cairns Taipans vs. (4) Tasmania JackJumpers

Play-in game

(3) Cairns Taipans vs. (6) Perth Wildcats

Semifinals series

(2) New Zealand Breakers vs. (4) Tasmania JackJumpers

(1) Sydney Kings vs. (3) Cairns Taipans

Grand Final series

(1) Sydney Kings vs. (2) New Zealand Breakers

Media coverage

Television 
Australian broadcast rights to the season are held by ESPN. All games are available live on ESPN and the streaming platform Kayo Freebies. Network 10 will broadcast Sunday afternoon games on 10 Peach and 10 Play.

See also 
 2022–23 NBL season
 2022–23 NBL regular season

References

External links 
 

National Basketball League (Australia) Finals
2022–23 NBL season